National Tertiary Route 611, or just Route 611 (or ) is a National Road Route of Costa Rica, located in the Puntarenas province.

Description
In Puntarenas province the route covers Golfito canton (Pavón district), Corredores canton (Laurel district).

References

Highways in Costa Rica